Hemidactylus dracaenacolus is a species of gecko endemic to Socotra. They are critically endangered and live among Socotra dragon trees.

References

Endemic fauna of Socotra
Reptiles of the Middle East
Hemidactylus
Reptiles described in 1999